James Beck Gordon (July 14, 1945 – March 13, 2023) was an American musician, songwriter, and convicted murderer. Gordon was a session drummer in the late 1960s and 1970s and was the drummer in the blues rock supergroup Derek and the Dominos.

In 1983, in a psychotic episode associated with undiagnosed schizophrenia, Gordon murdered his mother and was sentenced to 16 years to life in prison, remaining incarcerated until his death in 2023.

Music career
Gordon was raised in the San Fernando Valley of Los Angeles and attended Grant High School.  He passed up a music scholarship to UCLA in order to begin his professional career in 1963, at age 17, backing the Everly Brothers. He went on to become one of the most sought-after recording session drummers in Los Angeles. The protégé of studio drummer Hal Blaine, Gordon performed on many notable recordings in the 1960s, including Pet Sounds, by the Beach Boys (1966); Gene Clark with the Gosdin Brothers, by Gene Clark (1967); The Notorious Byrd Brothers, by the Byrds (1968); and the hit "Classical Gas", by Mason Williams (1968). At the height of his career Gordon was reportedly so busy as a studio musician that he flew back to Los Angeles from Las Vegas every day to do two or three recording sessions and then returned in time to play the evening show at Caesars Palace.

In 1969 and 1970 Gordon toured as part of the backing band for Delaney & Bonnie, which at the time included Eric Clapton. Clapton subsequently took over the group's rhythm section — Gordon (drummer), Carl Radle (bassist), Bobby Whitlock (keyboardist, singer, songwriter) — and they formed a new band, later called Derek and the Dominos. The band's first studio work was as the house band for George Harrison's three-disc set All Things Must Pass (1970).

Gordon then played on Derek and the Dominos' 1970 double album, Layla and Other Assorted Love Songs and also played with the band on subsequent U.S. and UK tours. The group split in spring 1971 before they finished recording their second album. In addition to his drumming, Gordon was credited with contributing the elegiac piano coda for the title track, "Layla". In later years, Whitlock claimed that the coda was not actually written by Gordon: "Jim took that piano melody from his ex-girlfriend Rita Coolidge. I know because in the D&B days I lived in John Garfield's old house in the Hollywood Hills and there was a guest house with an upright piano in it. Rita and Jim were up there in the guest house and invited me to join in on writing this song with them called "Time". (Her sister Priscilla wound up recording it with Booker T. Jones) Jim took the melody from Rita's song and didn't give her credit for writing it. Her boyfriend ripped her off". Graham Nash (who later dated Coolidge) substantiated Whitlock's claim in his memoir. "Time" was not released by Priscilla Coolidge and Booker T. until 1973, on their album Chronicles.

In 1970 Gordon was part of Joe Cocker's Mad Dogs & Englishmen tour and played on Dave Mason's album Alone Together. In 1971, he toured with Traffic and appeared on two of their albums, including The Low Spark of High Heeled Boys. That same year he played on Harry Nilsson's album Nilsson Schmilsson, contributing the drum solo on the track "Jump into the Fire".

Gordon was the drummer on the Incredible Bongo Band's album Bongo Rock, released in 1972, and his drum break on the LP version of "Apache" has been frequently sampled by rap music artists. In 1972, Gordon was also part of Frank Zappa's 20-piece 'Grand Wazoo' big band and the subsequent 10-piece 'Petit Wazoo' band. Perhaps his best-known recording with Zappa is the title track of the 1974 album Apostrophe ('), a jam with Zappa and Tony Duran on guitar and Jack Bruce on bass guitar, for which both Bruce and Gordon received a writing credit (Zappa, when introducing Gordon onstage, frequently referred to him as "Skippy", because of his youthful appearance). Also in 1972, Gordon played drums on Helen Reddy's Top 20 US album I Am Woman.

In 1973 Gordon played on Johnny Rivers' Blue Suede Shoes as well as on Art Garfunkel's Angel Clare albums, and toured with Rivers through 1974 appearing on the Last Boogie in Paris live album. Also in 1974, Gordon played on most of the tracks on Steely Dan's album Pretzel Logic, including the single "Rikki Don't Lose That Number". He again worked with Chris Hillman of the Byrds as the drummer in the Souther–Hillman–Furay Band from 1973 to 1975. He also played drums on three tracks on Alice Cooper's 1976 album, Alice Cooper Goes to Hell.

Mental health
Gordon developed schizophrenia and began to hear voices (including his mother’s) which compelled him to starve himself and prevented him from sleeping, relaxing or playing drums. His physicians misdiagnosed the problems and instead treated him for alcohol abuse.

While on tour with Joe Cocker in the early 1970s, Gordon reportedly punched his then-girlfriend Rita Coolidge in a hotel hallway, thereby ending their relationship.

Murder of mother, conviction and incarceration
On June 3, 1983, Gordon attacked his 71-year-old widowed mother, Osa Marie (Beck) Gordon, with a hammer, then fatally stabbed her with a butcher knife; he claimed that a voice told him to kill her.

Only after his arrest for murder was Gordon properly diagnosed with schizophrenia. At his trial, the court accepted that he had acute schizophrenia, but he was not allowed to use an insanity defense because of changes to California law due to the Insanity Defense Reform Act.

On July 10, 1984, Gordon was sentenced to 16 years to life in prison. He was first eligible for parole in 1991, but parole was  denied several times as he never attended a parole hearing.  In 2014, he declined to attend his hearing and was denied parole until at least 2018. A Los Angeles deputy district attorney stated at the hearing that he was still "seriously psychologically incapacitated" and "a danger when he is not taking his medication". In November 2017, Gordon was rediagnosed with schizophrenia. On March 7, 2018, Gordon was denied parole for the tenth time and was tentatively scheduled to become eligible again in March 2021. As of 2023, he was serving his sentence at the California Medical Facility, a medical and psychiatric prison in Vacaville, California.

Death 
Gordon died in prison on March 13, 2023, at the age of 77.

Partial discography 
During his career, Gordon played with a long list of musicians and record producers, including:

 Peter Allen: Taught by Experts
 Duane Allman: An Anthology
 Hoyt Axton: My Griffin Is Gone
 Joan Baez: Diamonds & Rust; From Every Stage; Gulf Winds; Blowin' Away
 The Beach Boys: Pet Sounds; Smiley Smile; Friends; 20/20
 The Beau Brummels: Triangle
 Stephen Bishop: Careless
 Cilla Black: It Makes Me Feel Good
 Bread: Bread
 Teresa Brewer: 16 Most Requested Songs
 Jackson Browne: The Pretender
 Jack Bruce: Out of the Storm
 The Byrds: The Notorious Byrd Brothers
 
 The Carpenters: Horizon; A Kind of Hush; Interpretations
 Chad and Jeremy: The Ark
 Cher: Stars
 Eric Clapton: Eric Clapton
 Gene Clark: Gene Clark with the Gosdin Brothers
 Joe Cocker: Mad Dogs & Englishmen
 Judy Collins: Who Knows Where the Time Goes
 Alice Cooper: Alice Cooper Goes to Hell; Lace and Whiskey
 Crosby, Stills & Nash: Crosby, Stills & Nash
 Burton Cummings: Burton Cummings; Dream of a Child
 Delaney & Bonnie: On Tour with Eric Clapton; D&B Together
 Derek and the Dominos: Layla and Other Assorted Love Songs; In Concert; Live at the Fillmore
 Neil Diamond: Beautiful Noise
 Donovan: Essence to Essence
 Dr. John: The Sun, Moon & Herbs
 
 The Everly Brothers: Gone Gone Gone; Beat & Soul; Two Yanks in England; Roots; Stories We Could Tell
 Art Garfunkel: Angel Clare; Breakaway
 David Gates: First
 Lowell George: Thanks, I'll Eat It Here
 Merle Haggard: Same Train, a Different Time
 Hall & Oates: Daryl Hall & John Oates; Bigger Than Both of Us
 Albert Hammond: It Never Rains in Southern California; The Free Electric Band; Albert Hammond
 George Harrison: All Things Must Pass; Living in the Material World; Extra Texture (Read All About It)
 Jim Henson: The Muppet Movie
 Richard "Groove" Holmes: Six Million Dollar Man
 John Lee Hooker: Endless Boogie
 Jim Horn: Through the Eyes of a Horn; Jim's Horn
 Thelma Houston: I've Got the Music in Me
 The Hues Corporation: Freedom for the Stallion; Rockin' Soul; Love Corporation; I Caught Your Act
 Incredible Bongo Band: "Apache"; Bongo Rock 
 Phil Keaggy: Love Broke Thru; Ph'lip Side
 B.B. King: B.B. King in London
 Carole King: The City
 Cheryl Ladd: Dance Forever
 John Lennon: "Power to the People"
 The Lettermen: Lettermen 1; Spin Away
 Gordon Lightfoot: Sundown; Cold on the Shoulder; Gord's Gold; Summertime Dream
 Nils Lofgren: Cry Tough
 Manhattan Transfer: Coming Out; Pastiche
 Dave Mason: Alone Together
 Country Joe McDonald: Love is a Fire
 
 Maria Muldaur: Maria Muldaur; Waitress in a Donut Shop
 Elliott Murphy: Elliott Murphy; Lost Generation
 Oliver Nelson: Skull Session 
 Tracy Nelson: Time Is on My Side
 Randy Newman: Randy Newman; 12 Songs
 Harry Nilsson: Aerial Ballet; Skidoo (Soundtrack); Harry; Nilsson Schmilsson; Son of Dracula (Soundtrack)
 Goro Noguchi: Goro in Los Angeles, U.S.A.
 Yoko Ono: Fly
 Van Dyke Parks: Song Cycle; Discover America
 Tom Petty and the Heartbreakers: Tom Petty and the Heartbreakers; Playback
 Kenny Rankin: Silver Morning
 Redeye: Redeye
 Emitt Rhodes: The American Dream
 Righteous Brothers: Give It to the People
 Minnie Riperton: Adventures in Paradise
 Johnny Rivers: L.A. Reggae; Blue Suede Shoes; Last Boogie in Paris; New Lovers and Old Friends; Wild Night; Outside Help
 Leon Russell: Leon Russell and the Shelter People
 Seals and Crofts: Seals & Crofts; Summer Breeze; Diamond Girl
 John Sebastian: Tarzana Kid
 Louie Shelton: Touch Me
 Judee Sill: Heart Food
 Carly Simon: No Secrets; Hotcakes; Playing Possum
 
 Tom Snow: Taking It All in Stride; Tom Snow
 
 The Souther-Hillman-Furay Band: The Souther-Hillman-Furay Band
 
 Joey Stec: Joey Stec
 Steely Dan: Pretzel Logic; "Here at the Western World"
 B. W. Stevenson: Lead Free; My Maria; Calabasas
 John Stewart: The Phoenix Concerts
 Stone Poneys: "Different Drum"; Evergreen, Volume 2
 Barbra Streisand: Barbra Joan Streisand
 Mariya Takeuchi: Love Songs
 Bob Thiele & His Orchestra: I Saw Pinetop Spit Blood
 Mel Tormé: Right Now!
 Traffic: Welcome to the Canteen; The Low Spark of High Heeled Boys
 John Travolta: John Travolta
 
 John Valenti: Anything You Want
 Tom Waits: The Heart of Saturday Night
 Tim Weisberg: Hurtwood Edge; Dreamspeaker
 Bobby Whitlock: Bobby Whitlock; Raw Velvet
 Andy Williams
 Mason Williams: "Classical Gas"
 Frank Zappa: Apostrophe ('); Läther; 'Grand Wazoo' (tour) and 'Petit Wazoo' (tour); Imaginary Diseases; Wazoo; Little Dots

References

External links
 Drummerworld - Jim Gordon
 Photo Derek and the Dominos
 Derek and the Dominos
 Friends Remember
 Full List Discography
 
  Drummers of Steely Dan
 

1945 births
2023 deaths
American rock drummers
American blues drummers
American session musicians
Delaney & Bonnie & Friends members
Derek and the Dominos members
Plastic Ono Band members
Souther–Hillman–Furay Band members
Traffic (band) members
American people convicted of murder
People with schizophrenia
American prisoners sentenced to life imprisonment
Prisoners sentenced to life imprisonment by California
Place of birth missing (living people)
Grammy Award winners
Songwriters from California
Warner Music Group artists
People convicted of murder by California
Matricides
The Wrecking Crew (music) members
People from the San Fernando Valley
Hall & Oates members
20th-century American drummers
American male drummers
Grant High School (Los Angeles) alumni